Ryszard Wach (born 26 April 1946) is a Polish modern pentathlete. He competed at the 1972 Summer Olympics.

References

1946 births
Living people
Polish male modern pentathletes
Olympic modern pentathletes of Poland
Modern pentathletes at the 1972 Summer Olympics
People from Radom County
Sportspeople from Masovian Voivodeship